The Battle of Beneventum was fought between Carthage and Roman republic in 212 BC. During this conflict Hanno, son of Bomilcar was defeated by Quintus Fulvius Flaccus. Livy gives a short account of this battle at 25.13-14.

References

Beneventum (212 BC)
Battles in Campania
Benevento
Beneventum (212 BC)
Beneventum (212 BC)